The 1957–58 Illinois Fighting Illini men’s basketball team represented the University of Illinois.

Regular season
Starting his second decade as the head coach of the University of Illinois' Fighting Illini basketball team, Harry Combes and his assistant coach and top recruiter, Howie Braun, were beginning to lose some of the top recruits from the state of Illinois. Talented players, such as Tom Hawkins, Charlie Brown, McKinley "Deacon" Davis, Nolden Gentry, John Tidwell and Charles "Chico" Vaughn were lured away to play for other programs during the late 1950s, a trend that would continue for Combes during his second decade.

The 1957-58 team returned several lettermen including the leading scorer Don Ohl and team "captain" John Paul. It also saw the return of Roger Taylor and Ted Caiazza. The team also added sophomores Govoner Vaughn, Mannie Jackson, Al Gosnell, Bruce Bunkenberg and Ed Perry. The Illini finished the season with a conference record of 5 wins and 9 losses, finishing in 8th place in the Big Ten. They would finish with an overall record of 11 wins and 11 losses.  The starting lineup included Govoner Vaughn at the center position, Roger Taylor and Don Ohl at guard and Mannie Jackson and John Paul at the forward slots.

Roster

Source

Schedule
												
Source																
												

|-
!colspan=12 style="background:#DF4E38; color:white;"| Non-Conference regular season

|-
!colspan=9 style="background:#DF4E38; color:#FFFFFF;"|Big Ten regular season

|-					

Bold Italic connotes conference game

Player stats

Awards and honors
Don Ohl
Converse 2nd Team All-American
Helms 3rd Team All-American
Team Most Valuable Player 
Govoner Vaughn
Converse Honorable Mention All-American

Team players drafted into the NBA

Rankings

References

Illinois Fighting Illini
Illinois Fighting Illini men's basketball seasons
1957 in sports in Illinois
1958 in sports in Illinois